Curtis Maxey (born June 28, 1965) is a former American football defensive end and defensive tackle. He played in the National Football League (NFL) for the Cincinnati Bengals in 1988 and for the Atlanta Falcons in 1989.

References

1965 births
Living people
American football defensive ends
American football defensive tackles
Grambling State Tigers football players
Cincinnati Bengals players
Atlanta Falcons players